Joe E. Campbell (born November 5, 1935) is an American professional golfer who played on the PGA Tour in the late 1950s and 1960s.

Campbell was born in Anderson, Indiana, where he attended Anderson High School – leading the Indians to IHSAA state titles in 1952 and 1953; winning the individual championships in both years. He attended Purdue University, where he was a member of the golf team as well as a co-captain of the basketball team. He won the 1955 NCAA Championship as Purdue finished 2nd in the team standings, he was also the 1956 and 1957 Big Ten Conference Champion and led Purdue to the 1955 and 1956 Big Ten Team Championships.  During his amateur career, he won the Indiana Amateur three times, the Indiana Open twice, and the Sunnehanna Amateur in 1957. His best finish in a major championship, which came during his amateur career, was T-22 at the 1957 U.S. Open.  He was also a member of the United States' 1956 Americas Cup and 1957 Walker Cup team, leading the Americans to an 8½–3½ victory over Great Britain.

Campbell turned professional in 1958 and joined the PGA Tour in 1959 and competed for fourteen years. He received Golf Digests Rookie-of-the-Year award in 1959.  His 43 top-10 finishes included three wins, seven runner-up and six third-place finishes; he finished in top-25 103 times.  He played on the Senior PGA Tour from 1986–89 and 1995–96, his best finish was a T-24th at the 1987 Bank One Senior Golf Classic.

Campbell made his home in Knoxville, Tennessee after graduating from college in 1957 until 1974. After his days as a tour professional were over, he was the golf professional at Knoxville's Whittle Springs from 1967–1974. In 1974, he became the men's golf team coach at Purdue, leading them to the 1981 Big Ten Championship and 24 Invitational titles, he retired following the 1993 season. Campbell is a member of the Indiana Golf Hall of Fame, inducted in 1969; the Purdue Intercollegiate Athletics Hall of Fame in 2001 and the Tennessee Golf Hall of Fame, inducted in 2007.

He now lives with his wife, in Lake Wales, Florida.

Amateur wins
1952 IHSAA Boys State Champion
1953 IHSAA Boys State Champion
1954 Indiana Amateur
1955 Indiana Amateur, Indiana Boys Junior, NCAA Championship (individual)
1956 Indiana Amateur, Indiana Boys Junior, Big Ten Conference Championship (individual)
1957 Sunnehanna Amateur, Big Ten Conference Championship (individual)

Professional wins (15)
PGA Tour wins (3)PGA Tour playoff record (1–2)Other wins (12)
1955 Indiana Open (as amateur)
1956 Indiana Open (as amateur)
1958 Tennessee Open
1965 Tennessee Open, Tennessee PGA Championship
1966 Tennessee PGA Championship
1967 Tennessee PGA Championship
1970 Tennessee PGA Championship
1972 Tennessee PGA Championship
1973 Tennessee Open
1977 Indiana Open
1981 Indiana Open

U.S. national team appearancesAmateur'
Walker Cup: 1957 (winners)
Americas Cup: 1956 (winners)

References

External links

Joe Campbell PGA Pro Profile

American male golfers
Purdue Boilermakers men's golfers
PGA Tour golfers
PGA Tour Champions golfers
Purdue Boilermakers men's golf coaches
Golfers from Indiana
Golfers from Knoxville, Tennessee
American men's basketball players
Purdue Boilermakers men's basketball players
Sportspeople from Anderson, Indiana
1935 births
Living people